Samsjøen is a lake in the municipalities of Ringerike and Jevnaker in Viken county.

Samsjøen receives inflow from the Haugerud river (Haugerudelva) which enters the lake from the northwest. Somma is the largest of the tributaries formed at the end of Samsjøen.  Somma starts from the south end of Samsjøen and flows southwest as it travels through the valley of Somdalen. The  watershed drains to the valley of Ådal and is part of Begna watershed.

See also
List of lakes in Norway

References

Lakes of Viken (county)